Westbury may refer to:

Places

United Kingdom 
Westbury, Buckinghamshire
Westbury, Shropshire
Westbury, Wiltshire
Westbury-on-Severn, Gloucestershire
Westbury-on-Trym, Bristol
Westbury-sub-Mendip, Somerset

United States 
Westbury, Connecticut, a town in Litchfield County
Westbury, New York, a village in Nassau County, New York on Long Island
Westbury (LIRR station), a station on the Long Island Rail Road's Main Line
Westbury, Cayuga County, New York, a hamlet on the border of Cayuga and Wayne counties in New York
Westbury, Houston, a neighborhood in Houston, Texas

Elsewhere
Westbury, Tasmania, Australia
Westbury, Quebec, Canada
Westbury, suburb of Limerick, Ireland
Westbury, Johannesburg, suburb of Johannesburg, South Africa

Other
Westbury (surname), including a list of people with the name
Westbury (housebuilder), British housebuilding company
Westbury (UK Parliament constituency), former constituency in Wiltshire
Westbury, model of guitar made by Univox

See also
Baron Westbury, a title in the Peerage of the United Kingdom
Westbury High School (disambiguation), several schools
Westbury Park (disambiguation), several places
Westbury Square (Houston)